Janine Charbonnier (8 June 1926 - 28 May 2022) was a French pianist, composer and pioneer in composer-generated music. She was born in Paris, and married writer Georges Charbonnier.

With Pierre Barbaud and Roger Blanchard, she co-founded the Groupe de Musique Algorithmique de Paris (GMAP). With the assistance of Bull Centre National Computing Electronics, they produced their first concert of algorithmic music, as part of an art festival at the Rodin Museum in Paris in June 1959.

Works
Selected works include:
La Varsovienne, electronic, 1965 (with Roger Blanchard)
The Warsaw, electronic, 1965 (with Pierre Barbaud)
Circus, a theatrical musical based on a novel by Maurice Roche
Exercice Op.3 for woodwind quartet
Prélude, Canon, Choral for woodwind quartet

References

1926 births
2022 deaths
20th-century classical composers
French music educators
French classical composers
French women classical composers
20th-century French women musicians
20th-century French composers
Women music educators
20th-century women composers
Musicians from Paris